Édith Vesperini (born 24 March 1945 in Paris) is a French costume designer for cinema, television and theater. She won the César Award for Best Costume Design for The King's Daughters.

Filmography

Cinema

 The Recourse to the Method (1978)
 Womanlight (1979)
 Sophie's Misfortunes (1980)
 Qu'est-ce qu'on attend pour être heureux! (1982)
 Three Men and a Cradle (1985)
 Van Gogh (1991)
 The Little Apocalypse (1993)
 Happiness Is in the Field (1995)
 Man Is a Woman (1998)
 The King's Daughters (2000)
 Druids (2001)
 Amen. (2002)
 The Colonel (2005)
 The Sea Wall (2008)
 Outside the Law (2010)
 Victor Young Perez (2013)
 Je ne rêve que de vous (2018)

Television
 Dust and Blood (1991)
 Sur le lieu (1991)
 Arthur Rimbaud, l'homme aux semelles (1994)
 Le monde d'Angelo (1997)
 Madame Sans-Gêne (2001)
 Capitaine des ténèbres (2004)
 A droite toute ! (2007)
 Louise Michel (2009-2014)
 Jeanne Devère (2010)
 Mystère au Moulin-Rouge (2011)
 La Baie d'Alger (2011)
 Résistance (2014)
 Nicolas Le Floch (2015)
 Un avion sans elle (2018)

Reference

External links
 

French costume designers
1945 births
Living people
People from Paris